Mahlon Williamson was an 1854 bark (or "barque") that sailed out of Wilmington, Delaware and New York. The ship was active in the cargo and guano trades. The ship is remembered today as the subject of a painting by maritime artist Joseph B. Smith, in which it is being towed on the Delaware River by tugboat William Cramp.

Voyages

Mahlon Williamson arrived in New York with a cargo of guano from Scharffenerk, St. Carle de Ancud, Chile, for G. Barrell, in December 1861. The ship returned to New York from New Orleans in November, 1865, with a cargo of cotton and flour for McLean & Lintz.

References

External links
Account of the grounding of the Mahlon Williamson and the Arcole near Cohansey

Barques
Age of Sail merchant ships of the United States
Delaware River
Guano trade
Individual sailing vessels
Ships built in Wilmington, Delaware
1854 ships